1999 ACC tournament may refer to:

 1999 ACC men's basketball tournament
 1999 ACC women's basketball tournament
 1999 ACC men's soccer tournament
 1999 ACC women's soccer tournament
 1999 Atlantic Coast Conference baseball tournament
 1999 Atlantic Coast Conference softball tournament